Roy Nelson may refer to:

Roy Nelson (fighter) (born 1976), American mixed martial artist
Roy Nelson (cartoonist) (1905–1956), American cartoonist and caricaturist
Roy Edgar Nelson (1925–2012), Canadian politician
John Doyle (comedian) (born 1953), who uses the pseudonym Roy Nelson, member of the comedy duo Roy and HG